Ratisbonne and Ratisbon are the French and English alternative names for Regensburg, a city in south-east Germany.

Ratisbonne and Ratisbon may also refer to:

Battle of Ratisbon (1809), also called the Battle of Regensburg, a battle fought during the Napoleonic Wars
Ratisbonne Monastery, a monastery in Jerusalem
Treaty of Ratisbonne (1630), also known as Peace Treaty of Regensburg, a peace treaty following the War of the Mantuan Succession

People
Andreas of Ratisbon (14th–15th century), Bavarian historian
Berthold of Ratisbon (13th century), Franciscan of the monastery of Ratisbon
Louis Ratisbonne (1827–1900), a French man of letters
The Ratisbonne Brothers, brothers who converted from Judaism to Catholicism
Marie-Alphonse Ratisbonne (1814-1884), a French Jew who converted to Catholicism and became a Jesuit Catholic priest and missionary
Marie-Théodor Ratisbonne (1802–1884), a French Jewish convert to Catholicism who became a priest and missionary

See also
 
Regensburg (disambiguation)